Suburban Wives, subtitled "nine to five widows in a sexual desert", is a 1971 British sex comedy directed by Derek Ford and starring Eva Whishaw, Maggie Wright, and Gabrielle Drake. It was described by The New York Times as "a spicy satire of modern manners and mores."

Premise
Newspaperwoman Sarah (Eva Whishaw) narrates a series of separate stories about the lives of various couples. Sarah describes a situation in which dissatisfied and bored middle-class housewives seek excitement and adventure outside their marital homes— and marital beds.

Cast
Eva Whishaw as Sarah 
Barry Linehan as John's Boss
Heather Chasen as Kathy Lambert 
Gabrielle Drake as Secretary
Richard Thorp as Sarah's Husband
Robin Culver as Photographer
Maggie Wright as Irene
Peter May as John
Claire Gordon as Sheila
Denys Hawthorne as George Lambert
Jane Cardew as Carole
Nicola Austin as Jean
Pauline Peart as Mavis
James Donnelly as Client 
Paul Antrim as Bookmaker

Reception
According to Leon Hunt the film represents the suburban wives as both "banal and voracious, passive and rapacious, timid and uncontainable." The Daily Mirror described the characters as a "monstrous regiment of frustrated wives". It portrays suburbia as a deadened, lifeless space, one that mirrors the "sexual desert" experienced by the characters, but which, as Hunt says, "just intensifies desire rather than diminishing it". Stephanie Dennison sees it as an example of "soft-core porn films" that represent "naughty suburban housewives" as part of "democratization of female sexual desire".

The film's commercial success led to a sequel, Commuter Husbands, marketed with the tagline "Remember what those Suburban Wives got up to?... Now see what their getaway men get down to!"

References

External links

1971 films
British sexploitation films
1970s English-language films
1970s sex comedy films
British sex comedy films
1971 comedy films
Films directed by Derek Ford
1970s British films